La stazione is a 1952 Italian documentary film directed by Valerio Zurlini.

External links
 

1952 films
1950s Italian-language films
Italian documentary films
1952 documentary films
Italian black-and-white films
1950s Italian films